The 2010–11 Greek Football Cup was the 69th edition of the Greek Football Cup. A total of 67 clubs had been accepted to enter, after the withdrawal of Egaleo, Kalamata and Pyrsos Grevena and their relegation to Delta Ethniki. The competition commenced on 4 September 2010 with the First Round and concluded on 30 April 2011 with the Final, held at Olympic Stadium. The final was contested by Atromitos and AEK Athens, with AEK winning 3-0.

Teams

Calendar

Participating clubs
The following 67 teams competed in First Round:

Knockout phase
Each tie in the knockout phase, apart from the quarter-finals and the semi-finals, was played by a single match. If the score was level at the end of normal time, extra time was played, followed by a penalty shoot-out if the score was still level. In the quarter-finals and the semi-finals were played over two legs, with each team playing one leg at home. The team that scored more goals on aggregate over the two legs advanced to the next round. If the aggregate score was level, the away goals rule was applied, i.e. the team that scored more goals away from home over the two legs advanced. If away goals were also equal, then extra time was played. The away goals rule was again applied after extra time, i.e. if there were goals scored during extra time and the aggregate score was still level, the visiting team advanced by virtue of more away goals scored. If no goals were scored during extra time, the winners were decided by a penalty shoot-out. In the round of 16, if the score was level at the end of normal time the two-legged rule was applied.The mechanism of the draws for each round is as follows:
In the draw for the second round, the teams from the second division are seeded and the winners from the first round were unseeded. The seeded teams are drawn against the unseeded teams.
In the draw for the Round of 32, the teams from the first division are seeded and the winners from the previous rounds were unseeded. The seeded teams are drawn against the unseeded teams.
In the draws for the Round of 16 onwards, there are no seedings and teams from the different group can be drawn against each other.

First round
The draw for this round took place on 18 August 2010.

Summary

|-
|colspan="3" style="background-color:#D0D0D0" align=center|4 September 2010

|-
|colspan="3" style="background-color:#D0D0D0" align=center|5 September 2010

|-
|colspan="3" style="background-color:#D0D0D0" align=center|N/A

|}

Matches

Second round
The draw for this round took place on 18 August 2010, after the First Round draw.

Summary

|-
|colspan="3" style="background-color:#D0D0D0" align=center|15 September 2010

|-
|colspan="3" style="background-color:#D0D0D0" align=center|16 September 2010

|}

Matches

Additional round
The draw for this round took place on 18 August 2010.

Summary

|-
|colspan="3" style="background-color:#D0D0D0" align=center|29 September 2010

|}

Matches

Bracket

Round of 32
The draw for this round took place on 18 August 2010.

Summary

|}

Matches

Round of 16
The draw for this round took place on 1 November 2010.

Summary

||colspan="2" rowspan="2" 

||colspan="2" 

||colspan="2" rowspan="3" 

|}

Matches

Replay

Quarter-finals
The draw for this round took place on 29 December 2010.

Summary

|}

Matches

Atromitos won 3–0 on aggregate.

Olympiakos Volos won 3–2 on aggregate.

AEK Athens won 4–3 on aggregate.

PAOK won 2–1 on aggregate.

Semi-finals
The draw for this round took place on 29 December 2010, after the quarter-final draw.

Summary

|}

Matches

AEK Athens won 1–0 aggregate.

Atromitos won 2–1 on aggregate.

Final

Top scorers

Own goals

References

External links
Greek Cup 2010-2011 at Hellenic Football Federation's official site
First, Second, Third and Fourth Round Draw (Greek)

Greek Football Cup seasons
Cup
Greek Cup